"Hypnodancer" is a song by the Russian punk-rave group Little Big, released on 8 May 2020 via Warner Music Russia and Little Big family. It was the first song to be released by the group after the single UNO, which was going to go to Eurovision 2020, before being cancelled due to the COVID-19 Pandemic.

Music video 
In addition to the usual group members, other celebrities took part in the video including: showman Alexander Gudkov, frontman of The Hatters, Yuri Muzychenko, vocalist of the Leningrad group Florida Chanturia, bloggers Ruslan Usachev and Danila Poperechny. The video was shot in St. Petersburg.

The plot of the video revolves around a group (Played by the members of Little Big), who visit various casinos, where the main character (Ilya Prusikin) jumps on the table and begins to dance a hypnotic dance, while his accomplices collect money from other players, after which they leave together. In one of the casinos, another hypnotist is found (Yuri Muzychenko) and a dance battle begins. The police arrive and they dance together called 'Super Hypnodancer' and quietly leave together.

Success 
The music video hit YouTube trends in 26 countries, and in Russia, Latvia, Ukraine, Estonia and Belarus, it took 1st place in the charts.

In the first hour of the videos upload, it was viewed 473,000 times, and 1 million times in the first three hours. In the first two days, it had 12.5 million views, and in 10 days, it had 33 million views.

The music video was ranked #5 on the international weekly chart of the most watched video on YouTube on May 14, 2020.

References

External links

Little Big (band) songs
2020 songs
Songs written by Ilya Prusikin